Army Museum Lahore is a museum located in Lahore documenting the military history of  the Pakistan Army. Established in 2017, it is based on Lahore Cantonment land opposite Lahore Airport. The museum is Pakistan's second largest collection of military objects in the country. The collection highlights the Military history of Pakistan, from the 16th century Mughal Empire to the modern day Pakistan.

Establishment 
Opened to general public on September 20, 2017, the museum has undergone complete re-haul ever since, and introduced sections from Mughal era to the more recent, Pakistan's War on Terrorism. The museum houses detailed history of evolution of Pakistan Army. The museum grounds also houses a war memorial to the fallen soldiers of IV Corps of the Pakistan Army.

Army Museum Lahore displays arms and ammunition from the Mughal Era and all the way up to modern weapons. Detailed history of the evolution of the Pakistan Army is displayed in the museum building.

References

External links 
 Homepage Pakistan Army Museum, Rawalpindi

Museums in Punjab, Pakistan
Pakistan Army
Army museums in Asia
Museums established in 1961
Museums established in 2017
Armour collections
Tourist attractions in Lahore
2017 establishments in Pakistan
Lahore District